Svetlana Smirnova may refer to:

 Svetlana Smirnova (sport shooter) (born 1962), Russian sport shooter
 Svetlana Smirnova (actress) (born 1956), Soviet and Russian film and stage actress
 Svetlana Smirnova, a Russian female tennis player born 1987